HMS Raider was a R-class destroyer built for the Royal Navy during the Second World War.

Description
She was powered by two Parsons geared steam turbines, each driving one propeller shaft, using steam provided by two Admiralty three-drum boilers. Her complement was 176 officers and ratings.

The ship was armed with four 45-calibre 4.7-inch (120 mm) Mark IX guns in single mounts. For anti-aircraft (AA) defence, Raider had one quadruple mount for QF 2-pdr Mark VIII ("pom-pom") guns and six single  Oerlikon autocannon. She was fitted with two above-water quadruple mounts for  torpedoes. Two depth charge rails and four throwers were fitted for which 70 depth charges were provided.

Construction and career
HMS Raider was adopted by Romford during World War II as part of Warship Week. She was launched on 1 April 1942 as the second Royal Navy ship to carry the name, previously borne by a destroyer built in 1916 and sold in 1927.

Postwar service
Raider was placed in Reserve at Devonport in January 1946 and was recommissioned for service in the Mediterranean on 6 May that year. The ship was extensively deployed for Plane Guard duties with aircraft carriers and took part in Fleet exercises. She returned to UK in August 1947 and reduced to Reserve status.

She was subsequently sold to the Indian Navy in 1948, where she was commissioned in 1949 as INS Rana (D115). Along with two other former R-class destroyers (Rajput and Ranjit) she formed part of the 11th destroyer Squadron.  She was decommissioned in 1976, and scrapped in 1979.

References

Bibliography
 
 
 
 
 
 
 
 

 

Q and R-class destroyers of the Royal Navy
Ships built on the River Mersey
1942 ships
World War II destroyers of the United Kingdom
R-class destroyers of the Indian Navy